Tsuyoshi Anthony Glinoga Horibata also known as Hori Horibata is a member of the Philippine House of Representatives from Camarines Sur's 1st District since 2022.He has also played baseball in the Big League Baseball World Series in 2011 and for Binghamton Bearcats of the American National Collegiate Athletic Association's Division I from 2013 to 2016.

References 

Living people
Binghamton Bearcats baseball players
Members of the House of Representatives of the Philippines from Camarines Sur
PDP–Laban politicians
Filipino baseball players
Filipino people of Japanese descent
Filipino politicians of Japanese descent
Year of birth missing (living people)